Although at the end of the previous season they relegated, Oțelul managed to retain their spot in Divizia A after the merger of FC Astra Ploieşti and newly promoted Petrolul Ploieşti. After 15 rounds played in Divizia A, Costel Orac was fired in December and replaced with Sorin Cârţu.

Competitions

Friendlies

Liga 1

League table

Results by round

Results summary

Matches

Cupa României

Players

Squad statistics

Transfers

In

Out

External links
 The Rec.Sport.Soccer Statistics Foundation at rsssf.com
 Divizia A at romaniansoccer.ro

See also

 2003–04 Divizia A
 2003–04 Cupa României

References

ASC Oțelul Galați seasons
Oțelul, Galați, ACS